Rumen Apostolov (24 August 1963 – 11 August 2002) was a Bulgarian footballer who played as a goalkeeper.

Honours
CSKA Sofia
Bulgarian League (2): 1988–89, 1989–90
Bulgarian Cup (2): 1987–88, 1988–89
Cup of the Soviet Army (2): 1988–89, 1989–90
Bulgarian Supercup: 1989

Lokomotiv Sofia
Bulgarian Cup: 1994–95

References

External links
Player Profile at fccska.com

1963 births
2002 deaths
Bulgarian footballers
PFC Spartak Varna players
PFC CSKA Sofia players
FC Botev Vratsa players
FC Lokomotiv 1929 Sofia players
First Professional Football League (Bulgaria) players
Association football goalkeepers